JUWELS is a supercomputer developed by Atos Forschungszentrum Jülich, capable of 70.980 petaflops (the speed is for JUWELS Booster Module). It replaced the now disused JUQUEEN supercomputer. JUWELS Booster Module is ranked as the eight fastest supercomputer in the world. The JUWELS Booster Module is part of a modular system architecture and a second Xeon based JUWELS Module ranks separately as the 52nd fastest supercomputer in the world.

JUWELS Booster Module uses AMD EPYC processors with Nvidia A100 GPUs for acceleration. University of Edinburgh contracted a deal to utilise JUWELS to pursue research in the fields of particle physics, astronomy, cosmology and nuclear physics.

In 2021, JUWELS Booster among eight other supercomputing systems participated in the MLPerf HPC training benchmark, which is the benchmark developed by the consortium of artificial intelligence developers from academia, research labs, and industry aiming to unbiasedly evaluate the training and inference performance for hardware, software, and services used for AI. JUWELS also ranked among the top 15 on the worldwide Green500 list of energy-efficient supercomputers.

The Simulation and Data Laboratory (SimLab) for Climate Science at Forschungszentrum Jülich uses JUWELS to detect gravity waves in the atmosphere by running computing programs to continuously download and compute on the operational radiance measurements from the NASA's data servers.

See also
 Computer science
 Computing
 Supercomputing in Europe
 Top500
 Green500

References

External links
Forschungszentrum Jülich website

Supercomputing in Europe